

The Vought FU was a biplane fighter aircraft of the United States Navy in service during the late 1920s.

Design and development

Pleased with the company's VE-7, in 1926 the Navy gave Vought a $459,709 contract for 20 convertible land/sea fighters. Vought already had a two-seat observation plane, the UO-1, basically a VE with additional fuselage streamlining and a Wright J-3 radial engine. This was made into a fighter simply by covering over the front cockpit of the observation plane, mounting machine guns in that area, and upgrading to a  Wright R-790 Whirlwind with a supercharger.

The FU-1s were delivered to VF-2B based in San Diego, California. With their float gear mounted, one was assigned to each of the battleships of the Pacific Fleet, where these observation seaplanes were launched from catapults. They spent eight months in this role, but as the squadron went to aircraft carrier operations, the further-aft cockpit proved to have a visibility problem when maneuvering around a carrier deck. In response, the forward cockpit was re-opened, the resulting aircraft being designated FU-2.

By this time they were obsolescent, and the two-seaters served primarily as trainers and utility aircraft.

Operators

 Peruvian Air Force - Two aircraft.
 Peruvian Navy - Two aircraft.

 United States Navy

Specifications (FU-1)

References

Notes

Bibliography
 Jones, Lloyd S. U.S. Naval Fighters. Fallbrook CA: Aero Publishers, 1977, pp. 53–54.
 Swanborough, Gordon and Bowers, Peter. United States Navy Aircraft since 1911. London:Putnam, Second edition, 1976. .

External links

F01U
Vought F01U
Single-engined tractor aircraft
Biplanes
Floatplanes